The Pârâul Câinelui is a left tributary of the river Vedea in Romania. It discharges into the Vedea in Mavrodin. The following villages are situated along the Pârâul Câinelui, from source to mouth: Căldăraru, Siliștea Gumești, Ciolăneștii din Vale, Necșești, Vârtoapele de Jos, Călinești and Mavrodin.

References

Rivers of Romania
Rivers of Argeș County
Rivers of Teleorman County